Band-e Amir (also Romanized as Band-e Amīr and Band Amīr) is a village in Alvir Rural District, Kharqan District, Zarandieh County, Markazi Province, Iran. At the 2006 census, its population was 132, in 44 families.

References 

Populated places in Zarandieh County